Members of the New South Wales Legislative Council who served from 1913 to 1917 were appointed for life by the Governor on the advice of the Premier. This list includes members between the election on 6 December 1913 and the election on 24 March 1917. The President was Sir Francis Suttor until his death in April 1915 and then Fred Flowers.

At the Easter 1916 NSW Labor Conference, the Holman government was censured "for refusing to endeavour to carry out and give effect to the first plank of the Labour platform - abolitlon of the Upper House". The Labor split in November 1916 over conscription completely recast the party composition of the Legislative Assembly. Premier Holman, and twenty of his supporters were expelled from the party for defying party policy and supporting conscription. They joined a grand coalition with the members of the various conservative parties. By 1917, this had coalesced into the Nationalist Party of Australia. No members of the Legislative Council were expelled at the time, however 4 members joined the Nationalist party and 2 sat as independents.

See also
Holman Labor ministry
Holman Nationalist ministry

Notes

References

 

Members of New South Wales parliaments by term
20th-century Australian politicians